Elmer Rae Steele (May 17, 1886 in Poughkeepsie, New York – March 9, 1966 in Rhinebeck, New York) was a pitcher in Major League Baseball. He pitched in the major leagues from 1907 to 1911.

He also played for several years in the minor leagues.  He began his professional career with the Poughkeepsie Colts of the Hudson River League in 1906.  He played his last year with the Blue Ridge League in 1917.

External links

1886 births
1966 deaths
Baseball players from New York (state)
Major League Baseball pitchers
Brooklyn Dodgers players
Boston Red Sox players
Boston Americans players
Pittsburgh Pirates players
Jackson Senators players
Poughkeepsie Colts players
Lynn Shoemakers players
Scranton Miners players
Providence Grays (minor league) players
Poughkeepsie Honey Bugs players
Memphis Chickasaws players
Beaumont Oilers players
Houston Buffaloes players
Chambersburg Maroons players
Cumberland Colts players
Gettysburg Ponies players
Burials at Poughkeepsie Rural Cemetery